Departmental decorations of Poland are decorations issued by Polish ministers and heads of some other state establishments. They do not have the status of Polish state decorations, which are usually issued by the head of the state.

Current decorations
(Dates of establishment/revisionss)
1951/1968/1996 – Medal „Siły Zbrojne w Służbie Ojczyzny” – Minister ON
1956/1972/1982/2000 – Medal Komisji Edukacji Narodowej – Minister EN
1962/2004 – Odznaka „Za opiekę nad zabytkami” – Minister KiDN
1966/1669/1991/2012/2013 – Medal „Za Zasługi dla Obronności Kraju” – Minister ON
1969/1994/2005/2012 – Decoration of Honor Meritorious for Polish Culture, Odznaka honorowa „Zasłużony dla Kultury Polskiej” – Minister KiDN
1976/2016 – Medal „Opiekun Miejsc Pamięci Narodowej” – Prezes IPN
1983/2005 – Odznaka honorowa „Za Zasługi dla Ochrony Środowiska i Gospodarki Wodnej” – Minister Ś
1986/2003 – Odznaka honorowa „Za zasługi dla ochrony zdrowia” – Minister Z
1988/2004 – Odznaka Honorowa za Zasługi dla Ochrony Pracy – GIP
1995/2003 – Odznaka honorowa „Za Zasługi dla Wynalazczości” – Prezes RM
1996/2001/2003 – Odznaka honorowa „Zasłużony dla Łączności” – Minister IiB
1996/1997 – Odznaka honorowa „Zasłużony dla Systemu Badań i Certyfikacji” – Dyrektor PCBiC
1996/2001 – Odznaka honorowa „Zasłużony dla Rolnictwa” – Minister RiRW
1997/2001 – Odznaka honorowa „Zasłużony dla polskiej geologii” – Minister Ś
1997/2000 – Odznaka honorowa „Zasłużony Pracownik Morza” – Minister GMiŻŚ
1997/2000 – Odznaka honorowa „Zasłużony dla transportu RP” – Minister IiB
1997/2000 – Odznaka honorowa „Zasłużony dla drogownictwa” – Minister IiB
1997 – Odznaka honorowa „Zasłużony dla Leśnictwa” – Minister Ś
1997/2006 – Odznaka honorowa „Zasłużony Honorowy Dawca Krwi” – PCK
1997/2005 – Odznaka „Honorowy Dawca Krwi – Zasłużony dla Zdrowia Narodu” – Minister Z
1997/2006/2008 – Odznaka „Zasłużony dla Ochrony Przeciwpożarowej” – Minister SW
1997/2003/2010 – Odznaka „Za zasługi w pracy penitencjarnej” – Minister Spraw.
1998/2002 – Odznaka honorowa „Za Zasługi dla Turystyki” – Minister SiT
1998/2001/2016 – Odznaka honorowa „Za zasługi dla Energetyki” – Minister R
1999/2002/2009/2016 – Odznaka honorowa „Za Zasługi dla Geodezji i Kartografii” – Minister AiC
1999/2002/2013/2016 – Odznaka honorowa „Za zasługi dla budownictwa” – Minister IiB
1999 – Medal Wojska Polskiego – Minister ON
2000 – Odznaka honorowa „Zasłużony dla Kolejnictwa” – Minister IiB
2001 – Medal „Za Zasługi dla Policji” – Minister SW
2001/2016 – Odznaka honorowa „Zasłużony dla górnictwa RP” – Minister R
2003 – Odznaka honorowa „Za zasługi dla statystyki RP” – Prezes GUS
2003/2011 – Odznaka honorowa „Za Zasługi dla bankowości RP” – Prezes NBP
2003 – Odznaka honorowa „Za Zasługi dla Finansów Publicznych RP” – Minister F
2004 – Medal za Zasługi dla Straży Granicznej – Minister SW
2005 – Medal for Merit to Culture – Gloria Artis, Medal „Zasłużony Kulturze Gloria Artis” – Minister KiDN
2005/2008 – Odznaka „Dawca Przeszczepu” – Minister Z
2009 – Bene Merito honorary badge, Odznaka Honorowa „Bene merito” – Minister SZ
2009 – Odznaka honorowa „Za Zasługi dla Ochrony Praw Człowieka” – RPO
2010/2012 – Odznaka „Semper paratus” – DGSW
2011 – Medal „Pro Patria” – Kierownik UDSKiOR
2011 – Odznaka Honorowa „Za zasługi w działaniach poza granicami RP” – Minister SW
2011 – Odznaka Honorowa imienia gen. Stefana Roweckiego „Grota” – Szef ABW
2011/2013 – Odznaka Honorowa „Za zasługi w zapewnianiu bezpieczeństwa państwa poza granicami RP” – Prezes RM
2011/2016 – Odznaka honorowa „Zasłużony dla Przemysłu Naftowego i Gazowniczego” – Minister E
2012 – Odznaka „Za Zasługi dla Sportu” – Minister SiT
2013 – Odznaka Honorowa za Zasługi dla Ochrony Praw Dziecka – RPD
2013 – Odznaka Honorowa Zasłużonego dla Bezpieczeństwa w Górnictwie – Prezes WUG
2014 – Odznaka Honorowa za Zasługi dla Rozwoju Gospodarki RP – Minister R
2015 – Odznaka Honorowa za Zasługi dla Legislacji – Prezes RM
2015/2016 – Odznaka Honorowa za Zasługi dla Samorządu Terytorialnego – Minister AiC
2015 – Odznaka Honorowa Primus in Agendo – Minister RPiPS
2015 – Odznaka honorowa „Działacza opozycji antykomunistycznej lub osoby represjonowanej z powodów politycznych” – Kierownik UDSKiOR
2015 – Medal „Reipublicae Memoriae Meritum” – Prezes IPN
2018 – Medal „Pro Bono Poloniae” – Kierownik UDSKiOR 
2020 – Odznaka Honorowa Meritis pro Familia – Minister RPiPS

Former decorations
1962: Honorary badge Meritorious Activist of Culture; superseded by the Medal for Merit to Culture – Gloria Artis

References